Ayethaya (also spelt Aye Thar Yar) is a town and resort in the Shan State of eastern Burma. It is located just outside Taunggyi and is a relatively new town. It contains the Technological University of Taunggyi and the Aye Thar Yar Golf Resort.

References

Populated places in Taunggyi District
Taunggyi Township